Richard Salter may refer to:
Richard Salter (artist) (born 1979), British artist known for his military paintings
Richard Salter (inventor), who made the first spring balances in Britain
Richard Salter (singer) (1943–2009), English baritone
Richard Salter (writer), British writer who wrote Doctor Who stories including Short Trips: The Ghosts of Christmas